James Ashley may refer to:

James Ashley (politician) (1940–2006), Lord Mayor of Manchester, England
James Mitchell Ashley (1824–1896), member of the U.S. House of Representatives
James Ashley (1958–1998), Englishman shot dead by Sussex Police - see Shooting of James Ashley

See also